The Pale Beyond is a survival role-playing video game developed by Bellular Studios and published by Fellow Traveller. It was released for Microsoft Windows and macOS on 24 February 2023. The game follows an Antarctic expedition that gets trapped in the ice as the player must manage the crew successfully to survive. Bellular Studios, a small development company based in Belfast, created the game and was inspired by historical Antarctic expeditions.

Gameplay 

As the acting Captain of the Temperance after the Captain's disappearance at the beginning of an Antarctic expedition, the player must manage the crew and keep them alive to survive the ice. The game has time that passes each week, during which the player is responsible for managing a number of resources, including food, fuel, and decorum. "Decorum" represents the ship's overall morale and how the crew is holding together. Each week, the player is responsible for deciding requests which can involve settling fights between crew-members or taking sides on arguments. Often, decisions that could seem reasonable on the face of themselves can lead the player towards ruin, and for a successful playthrough, the player must consider their resources accordingly. It is important to also keep up the loyalty of crew-members in order to ensure survival (and that your decisions are followed or supported). Rations that are on board the ship eventually expire, requiring the crew to hunt for food, and fuel that is available through coal in the ship's stores rapidly depletes as well, requiring the player to carefully stockpile supplies to survive.

The game uses a "locked tree" system, which allows players to attempt to change the fate of their crew either after deleting newer save files or choosing load points after completing a game.

Plot 
Although The Pale Beyond progresses generally in a linear fashion, it features a "locked tree" system where the outcomes of the game can change radically depending on the player's choices.

The player controls Robin Shaw, who is interviewed at the beginning of the game by Captain Hunt, an old Antarctic expeditionary veteran. Shaw is hired by Hunt to be the First Mate on the Temperance, a ship that is leaving for an Antarctic expedition to find The Viscount, a lost expedition and the Temperance's sister ship. At the onset of the expedition, Hunt is obfuscating about certain parts of the expedition and although the Captain is respected by the crew, he is inattentive and at one point is found drunk by Shaw in the Captain's quarters.

Hunt goes missing a month after the journey begins once the Temperance gets stranded in Antarctic ice, and as First Mate, the player is put into the role of Captain and must help the vessel survive the polar winter. The leader of the ship's science team, Templeton, informs Shaw that they must hold a vote to become Captain, using the loyalty of the crew (or lack thereof) to determine the result. Templeton also assures Shaw that a rescue party is being sent by their benefactor, but that they must hold out for the set number of weeks needed to make it. After several weeks stranded on the Temperance, the ship sinks from the pressure and the crew makes camp on the ice. As the ground begins to crack, the crew is forced further inland (dealing with a possibly deadly leopard seal attack along the way), and must hole up to survive the winter.

Development 
The Pale Beyond is the first game from Belfast-based video game developer Bellular Studios. The group was founded by Thomas Hislop and Michael Bell, friends who took programming courses together at Queen's University Belfast. Bell founded a YouTube channel called "Bellular Gaming" which began to get a following while Hislop got involved with theater in his spare time. The friends decided to work together to develop video games as they thought their skillsets would complement each other.

Originally, the studio tried to develop a mobile game which was cancelled before it could be released, and another game which also failed. The studio announced a World of Warcraft mod that would have overhauled the early quests in the game with voice acting and other modern features, which was shut down by the game's developer, Blizzard. Hislop said in an interview that the lessons from these original games they attempted to develop helped to narrow the scope of what they were going to try to create with The Pale Beyond to something that was within their abilities.

The development team used historical Arctic expedition stories, including the Imperial Trans-Antarctic Expedition, the Terra Nova Expedition, and Franklin's lost expedition as inspiration for some of the elements facing the player. Hislop also cited the book The Lost Men, which chronicles the Shackleton expedition's support team that was building depots for them, and Endurance: Shackleton's Incredible Voyage as having anecdotes that were inspiring for their gameplay. The game designers considered adding supernatural horror elements to the game, but consistently decided to stick with real-world survival concerns throughout development. Hislop said that "real history is weirder" in reference to their decision to not include those elements. Hislop noted that animals are commonly afterthoughts in historical accounts of surviving winter cold, and that they wanted to make sure that you felt the tough decisions of deciding to slaughter the sled dogs if you decide to by giving them a voice through the kennel master's character. The game also includes an in-depth focus on how people are interacting and staying together, with Hislop noting that the effect of a shared trauma can bring people together in a unique way.

Hislop noted that they were particularly focused on the artistic design of the title during development. Audio director James Bruce was tasked with making sound effects for the game. The Endurance book had notes about the sound the Endurance made as ice slowly crushed the hull, and Bruce recorded sounds to mimic the noise as described by sailors. The team used BBC Sound Archive recordings of penguins and seals. The sound design was important because of the featureless landscape. Hislop said, "You can't do your normal filler of like, 'Oh, we'll have birds chirping and trees swaying.' It's, 'Uh, James, can you make wind sound interesting for 10 hours? And not repetitive?'"

Reception 
The Pale Beyond has received "generally favourable" reviews according to Metacritic. Rock Paper Shotguns Rachel Watts compared the game favourably with Frostpunk, describing it as "more human" and noted that the game's loyalty system made you make wrenching choices in specific ways. Watts said that "decisions are hard because you're losing characters you've made connections with" but criticised the game for its save system's lengthy time between saves. Polygon's Alexis Ong felt that the game maintained a "desolate sort of charm, rough edges and all" but lightly critiqued a fourth wall breaking moment towards the end of The Pale Beyond plot along with its overall narrative cohesion.

References

External links 
 The Pale Beyond at Fellow Traveler
 Developer website

2023 video games
Fellow Traveller games
Indie video games
MacOS games
Naval video games
Role-playing video games
Single-player video games
Survival video games
Video games developed in the United Kingdom
Video games set in Antarctica
Windows games